Rodrigo Adrián Zamora Fernández (born 28 October 1986) is an American-born Mexican basketball player for Aguacateros de Michoacán and the Mexico national team, the latter at the 2014 FIBA Basketball World Cup.

Zamora is the youngest of five siblings born to Francisco Zamora and Alberta Fernández. His family is originally from Gómez Farías, Michoacán. He averaged 19.3 points, 10 rebounds and four blocks per game at Gavilan College before transferring to Montana State.

Zamora debuted with the Mexico national team in 2010.

References

External links
 Adrián Zamora at RealGM

1986 births
Living people
2014 FIBA Basketball World Cup players
Aguacateros de Michoacán players
American men's basketball players
American sportspeople of Mexican descent
Basketball players at the 2015 Pan American Games
Basketball players from California
Caballeros de Culiacán players
Dorados de Chihuahua (LNBP) players
Forwards (basketball)
Fuerza Regia de Monterrey players
Halcones Rojos Veracruz players
Huracanes de Tampico players
Junior college men's basketball players in the United States
Mexican men's basketball players
Montana State Bobcats men's basketball players
Pan American Games competitors for Mexico
People from Watsonville, California
Soles de Mexicali players
Sportspeople from the San Francisco Bay Area